Jin Hao,, which translates to "Gold Number", is a group of radio stations in Shaanxi, China serving Xi'an, China and the greater provincial area.

External links
 Official Website
 Official Website (translated to English with Babelfish)
 Source: Piyin translated by Cozy Website

Chinese-language radio stations
Mandarin-language radio stations
Radio stations in China
Mass media in Xi'an